Pedro Obama (born 11 November 1987) is an Equatoguinean former footballer who played as a midfielder.

References

1987 births
Living people
Equatoguinean footballers
Association football midfielders
The Panthers F.C. players
AD Racing de Micomeseng players
Equatorial Guinea international footballers